Lucie Ahl (born 23 July 1974 in Exeter, Devon) is a tennis coach and a former professional tennis player. She was briefly the British No.1, holding the position for 9 non-consecutive weeks between 30 July 2001 and 5 May 2002. She reached her highest singles ranking of world No.161 on 1 April 2002.

In her career, Ahl won a total of 15 titles on the ITF Women's Circuit and also participated on the WTA Tour. She had career wins over ITF & WTA Tour players Sandra Cacic and Rene Simpson.

Her best Grand Slam performance came at the 2000 Wimbledon Championships, where she defeated Austrian Barbara Schwartz in round one to capture the first and only win of her career in Grand Slam competition. Ahl also represented Great Britain at the Fed Cup on one occasion, winning all three of her rubbers and thus remaining undefeated in Fed Cup action.
Brother Daniel was ranked number 1 on the ITF world over 35 ratings in 2007

ITF circuit finals

Singles (9–7)

Doubles (6–9)

Performance timelines

Singles

Doubles

Mixed doubles

Fed Cup

References

External links

 
 

Living people
1974 births
British female tennis players
Female sports coaches
English female tennis players
English tennis coaches
Tennis people from Devon